Nueva Navidad is the third studio album by Puerto Rican singer Ednita Nazario. It was released in 1976.

Track listing
 "Blanca Navidad" (White Christmas) - 4:08
 "Blue Christmas" - 2:53
 "Ilusión" (Have Yourself A Merry Little Christmas) - 2:39
 "Canción" (Christmas Song) - 4:06
 "Escucha Mi Canción?" (Do You Hear What I Hear?) - 5:58
 "Nueva Navidad" (Winter Wonderland) - 2:42
 "Sleigh Ride" - 2:38
 "Vete Vete" - 2:58

Personnel
 Produced by Samara Productions

Ednita Nazario albums
1976 Christmas albums
Christmas albums by Puerto Rican artists